Nauru national football team may refer to two national sports teams of the Republic of Nauru:

 Nauru national Australian rules football team, nicknamed the Chiefs
 Nauru national soccer team